Krisztina Csáky (1654-1723) was a Hungarian countess. She participated in Rákóczi's War of Independence in 1703-1711.

In 1695, she married, for the third time, count Miklós Bercsényi. The couple resided at the Uzhhorod Castle, which became a center of Western culture in Hungary. Krisztina Csáky became regarded as an ideal model of Hungarian femininity. She and her spouse joined forces with Rákóczi in his rebellion against Austria. After the defeat in 1710, the couple left Hungary for the Ottoman Empire, where they lived the rest of their life in exile.

Notes

17th-century Hungarian people
18th-century Hungarian people
1654 births
1723 deaths
Women in 18th-century warfare
Women in European warfare